The Neuroblastoma Society is a UK charity that helps families affected by neuroblastoma by funding research and running a befriending scheme for parents. The charity was set up in 1982 by a group of parents whose children had suffered from or died of neuroblastoma.

References

External links
 The Neuroblastoma Society

Cancer organisations based in the United Kingdom
Health charities in the United Kingdom